Ouanne is a commune in the Yonne department in Bourgogne-Franche-Comté in north-central France, in the natural region of Forterre.

History
Existed at the time Gallo-Roman under the name of Odouna or Oduna. A Roman way carried out in Auxerre. The ancient station of Ouanne is known according to a marble fragment from the 3rd century preserved at the museum of Autun. The marble indicates the distances on the Roman way of Auxerre to Entrains-sur-Nohain. This way saw passing the armies of Pippin the Younger.

In 1790, Ouanne becomes chief town of canton but the number of cantons falls and the village is attached to Courson-les-Carrières. In December 1972, Ouanne was merged with Merry-Sec and Chastenay. In January 1980, Merry-Sec became a separate commune again.

Geography

Demography
Inhabitants are known as Ouannais.

Places and monuments
 Notre-Dame Church, blazing style, (15th-16th centuries), entirely arched.
 Source de l'Ouanne, close to the laundrette builds in 1867.
 Castle of the Mines, (16th century).

Personalities
 René Lepage de Ste-Claire

See also
Communes of the Yonne department

References

Communes of Yonne
Orléanais